This is a list of University of Bristol people, including a brief description of their notability. This list includes not just former students but persons who are or have been associated with the university, including former academics, Chancellors, and recipients of honorary degrees.

Staff and academics

Chancellors and Vice-Chancellors

Alumni

Government and politics

United Kingdom

International

The Law
Alexander Cameron, English Barrister
Eve Cornwell, YouTuber and former lawyer
Sir Richard Field, English High Court Judge, Academic of University of British Columbia, University of Hong Kong, McGill University
 Louisa Ghevaert, British family law lawyer
Brenda Hale, Baroness Hale of Richmond, English judge and first woman to be appointed as the President of the Supreme Court of the United Kingdom, Chancellor of University (2004-2016)
 Sir Stephen Laws, British lawyer and civil servant who served as the First Parliamentary Counsel (2006-2012)
Victoria Sharp, English Lady Justice of Appeal and Vice-President of the Queen's Bench Division
Kathryn Thirlwall, English Lady Justice of Appeal and Deputy Senior Presiding Judge

Academia

Literature

Economics and business

Journalism

Science

TV, film, radio and theatre

Sports

Music

James Blunt, musician, singer-songwriter
Hugh Cornwell, lead singer of The Stranglers
Julian Grant, classical music composer
Jamie Lidell, musician and soul singer, signed to Warp Records
Will Todd, classical and jazz composer; jazz pianist
Harriet Wheeler, musician, singer for The Sundays
Jonathan Whitehead, film and television composer

Others
Roly Bain, clown-priest
Mark Hewitt, potter
Rob Munro, Bishop of Ebbsfleet
Mary Talbot, naval officer who served as Director of the Women's Royal Naval Service

See also
:Category:Alumni of the University of Bristol

References

External links
Bristol's featured alumni
Bristol's alumni on University Challenge Christmas Special 2012

Bristol
University of Bristol